Malumeng is a community council located in the Mafeteng District of Lesotho. Its population in 2006 was 9,740.

Villages
The community of Malumeng includes the villages of Ha Heri, Ha Isaka, Ha Kubelle, Ha Lebamang, Ha Leboto, Ha Mabatla, Ha Mahooana, Ha Maisane, Ha Majara, Ha Manthama, Ha Marite, Ha Mashaile, Ha Masia, Ha Masooane, Ha Mokoenehi, Ha Molete, Ha Moloi, Ha Monono, Ha Monyane, Ha Moqanyane, Ha Motamolane, Ha Mothokho, Ha Ntšonyane, Ha Pitso, Ha Ralintoane, Ha Ramathaha, Ha Ramathaleha, Ha Ramatima, Ha Rantaba, Ha Raseboko, Ha Ratheepe, Ha Seatile, Ha Sebaki, Ha Sebatli, Ha Sekhele, Ha Sekhonyana, Ha Seshemane, Ha Tjoobe, Ha Tobi, Ha Turupu, Khohlong, Libopeng, Limapong, Liptjemptjeteng, Mahlokeng, Malumeng, Manganeng, Marabeng, Matebeng, Moeaneng, Motse-Mocha, Qibing, Sehlabaneng, Sekhutlong, Thibella, Thoteng and Thoteng-ea-Khoete.

References

External links
 Google map of community villages

Populated places in Mafeteng District